Sarat Saikia (11 March 1948 – 1 August 2019) was an Indian politician belonging to Bharatiya Janata Party. He was elected as a member of the Assam Legislative Assembly from Mahmora
for three times.

Early life and education
Saikia was born on 11 March 1948. His father's name was Durgeswar Saikia and his mother's name was Binaya Saikia. His father was a minister of Assam Government. He graduated from Dibrugarh University in 1972.

Political life
Saikia was elected as a member of the Assam Legislative Assembly in 2001 from Mahmora as an Indian National Congress candidate. He was elected again from Mahmora in 2006 and 2011. Later, he joined Bharatiya Janata Party.

Personal life
Saikia was married to Sewali Saikia on 5 May 1974. The couple had two children.

Death
Saikia died on 1 August 2019 at the age of 71.

References

Bharatiya Janata Party politicians from Assam
2019 deaths
Members of the Assam Legislative Assembly
1948 births
Indian National Congress politicians from Assam
Dibrugarh University alumni